"Love Like Woe" is the debut single by American electropop singer-songwriter Jordan Witzigreuter, also known as The Ready Set, from his major label debut album, I'm Alive, I'm Dreaming. It was written by Witzigreuter and J.R. Rotem, who also produced the track. The song peaked at number 27 on the Billboard Hot 100 and number 30 on the Canada CHR/Top 40. The music video for the song features a cameo appearance from Pete Wentz of Fall Out Boy, and was released on March 31, 2010.

Background and release
"Love Like Woe" was written based on experiences Witzigreuter had seen his friends grappling with. He stated, "It's about a situation where you want to be with someone but they are tough to deal with so you are trying to salvage the relationship." In 2010, Witzigreuter worked with rap duo New Boyz and released a mash-up version of the song. The song reached number 10 on AOL Radio.

As of October 2010, "Love Like Woe" sold 46,000 digital downloads in the US. In November 2010, the single won a BDS Certified Spin Award based on the 50,000 spins it received.

Composition
The song was written by Jordan Witzigreuter and was produced by J. R. Rotem who also co-wrote the song. According to Witzigreuter, the song was written in his mother's basement and that the song was never meant to be released as a single. In a separate interview in 2018, Witzigreuter revealed that he didn't intend on using the song after writing it. He also stated that he wrote the song in 20 minutes.

Critical reception

"Love Like Woe" was received with some mixed reception as Bill Lamb from About.com gave the single a 3.5 star rating. He praises the song by having a sing-along pop melody, clever lyrical hook and simple, appealing pop melody. However, he criticized the song for having overworked electronic effects. Overall, he remarked, "it is a bit over-dressed, but you are unlikely to switch the radio station when you hear Love Like Woe."

Music video
The first music video for "Love Like Woe" was released on March 31, 2010. It has received over 20 million hits on YouTube. It takes place in the middle of the woods where Jordan and a group of people are having a party in a shack. Outside, zombies try to enter to the party with little success. The music video was directed by Isaac Ravishankara.

A second version of the music video was released in February 2011. It features Witzigreuter getting ready to impress a girl when he drives up to her mother's house. He gathers a red heart-shaped box of candy, a large bouquet, and several animals, only to find out that his interest wasn't at her mother's house that day. The video also cuts in between him singing the song and his romantic interest getting ready for the day. This version of the music video was directed by Chris Marrs Piliero.

Track listing

Charts

Certifications

Release history

References

2009 songs
2010 debut singles
Song recordings produced by J. R. Rotem
Songs written by J. R. Rotem